Frederick B. Keller (born October 23, 1965) is an American politician from the Commonwealth of Pennsylvania, who served as the U.S. representative for Pennsylvania's 12th congressional district from 2019 to 2023. He was a Republican member of the Pennsylvania House of Representatives for the 85th district from 2011 until his resignation in May 2019 following election to the U.S. House.

On February 28, 2022, Keller announced that he would not seek reelection in 2022 after being drawn out of his Congressional district.

Early life and career
Keller was born in Page, Arizona, to parents who were native Pennsylvanians that had moved west for work. After graduating from Shikellamy High School in 1984, Keller got a job at Conestoga Wood Specialties, a factory that makes cabinets and other wooden kitchen products, in Beavertown, Pennsylvania. He was ultimately promoted to become the plant operations manager. In 1990, Keller began a real estate property business, and attended Don Paul Shearer Real Estate school in 1995.

Pennsylvania House of Representatives
In 2010, Keller ran as a Republican for the Pennsylvania House of Representatives in the 85th district, seeking to succeed Republican Russ Fairchild, who was retiring. He was elected to the Pennsylvania House, and was reelected every two years through 2018. He was appointed to the board of trustees of the Pennsylvania Public School Employees' Retirement System in 2019.

U.S. House of Representatives

Elections

2019 special election 

Following Tom Marino's resignation from the United States House of Representatives in January 2019, Keller declared his candidacy in the 2019 Pennsylvania's 12th congressional district special election.

He won the Republican nomination at a conference meeting on March 2. Keller won the general election on May 21, defeating previous 2018 Democratic nominee Marc Friedenberg, and resigned from his state House seat on May 22. He was sworn in on June 3.

2020 

Keller ran for and won reelection on November 3, 2020, against Lee Griffin, gaining 70.8% of the vote.

Tenure
In December 2020, Keller was one of 126 Republican members of the House of Representatives who signed an amicus brief in support of Texas v. Pennsylvania, a lawsuit filed at the United States Supreme Court contesting the results of the 2020 presidential election, in which Joe Biden prevailed over incumbent Donald Trump. The Supreme Court declined to hear the case on the basis that Texas lacked standing under Article III of the Constitution to challenge the results of the election held by another state.

House Speaker Nancy Pelosi issued a statement that called signing the amicus brief an act of "election subversion." Additionally, Pelosi reprimanded Keller and the other House members who supported the lawsuit: "The 126 Republican Members that signed onto this lawsuit brought dishonor to the House. Instead of upholding their oath to support and defend the Constitution, they chose to subvert the Constitution and undermine public trust in our sacred democratic institutions."

Immigration
Keller voted against the Further Consolidated Appropriations Act of 2020, which authorizes DHS to nearly double the available H-2B visas for the remainder of FY 2020.

Keller voted against the Consolidated Appropriations Act (H.R. 1158), which effectively prohibits ICE from cooperating with Health and Human Services to detain or remove illegal alien sponsors of unaccompanied alien children (UACs).

Committee assignments 
 Committee on Education and Labor
 Subcommittee on Early Childhood, Elementary and Secondary Education
 Committee on Oversight and Reform

Caucus memberships 
 Chairman, Bureau of Prisons Reform Caucus
 Conservative Climate Caucus
 Republican Study Committee

Electoral history

Personal life
Keller has three siblings. Soon after he began working, Keller married his wife Kay. Together, they have two grown children, one of whom survived after being hospitalized on life support and being told there was no chance for recovery. As of April 2019, the Kellers also had two grandchildren.

References

External links
 
 State Representative Fred Keller, official caucus site
 Fred Keller (R), official PA House site (archived May 2019)
 

|-

|-

1965 births
21st-century American politicians
American cabinetmakers
Candidates in the 2019 United States elections
Living people
People from Page, Arizona
People from Snyder County, Pennsylvania
Republican Party members of the Pennsylvania House of Representatives
Republican Party members of the United States House of Representatives from Pennsylvania